Volavérunt is a 1999 French-Spanish historical drama film directed by Bigas Luna. Based on a novel with the same title by Antonio Larreta, the film is set in Spain at the beginning of the nineteenth century.

Cast

References

External links 

1999 drama films
Films set in Madrid
Films about royalty
Films set in the 1800s
Cultural depictions of Francisco Goya
1999 films
Spanish biographical drama films
French biographical drama films
Films directed by Bigas Luna
1990s Spanish-language films
1990s French films
Cultural depictions of Spanish women